Nashik Metropolitan Region (NMR) is the metropolitan region around the city of Nashik. The Nashik Metropolitan Region Development Authority (NMRDA) is the planning and development authority of the region formed. NMRDA is headed by the Chief minister of Maharashtra (presently by Eknath Shinde). Radhakrushna Game, IAS, is the chief executive officer. The authority is responsible for various town planning schemes.

Municipal Corporation 
 Nashik Municipal Corporation

Growth Centers 
 Growth Center of Ghoti (bk), Khambale & Dahalewadi
 Gonde -Vadivarhe Growth Center
 Pimpalgaon Basvant Urban Growth Center
 Sinnar Urban Growth Center
 Ozar Urban Growth Center
 Dindori Growth Center

Villages Under NMRDA in Nashik Taluka 
 Ambe Bahula
 Govardhan
 Mungsare
 Shinde
 Babhaleshwar
 Govindpur
 Nagalwadi
 Shivangaon
 Belatgavhan
 Hinganvedhe
 Naikwadi
 Subhash Nagar
 Belgaon Dhaga
 Indira Nagar
 Nanegaon
 Sultanpur
 Bhagur (Gramn)
 Jakhori
 Odha
 Talegaon-Anjneri
 Chandgiri
 Jalalpur
 Ojharkhed
 Tiradshet
 Chandashi
 Jategaon
 Palse
 Vadgaon
 Dahegaon
 Kalvi
 Pipalgaon Garudeshwar
 Vaishnav Nagar
 Dari
 Kasyap Nagar
 Pimpalad Nashik
 Vanjar Wadi
 Devargaon
 Kotamgaon
 Pimpri Sayyad
 Villholi
 Donvade
 Ladchi
 Rahuri
 Vinchur Gavali
 Dudgaon
 Lahvit
 Raykad Nagar
 Vasali
 Dugaon
 Lakhalgaon
 Rajewadi
 Yashwant Nagar
 Ganeshgaon Naik
 Lohshingave
 Rahurbahula
 Sandgaon
 Ganeshgaon Trambak
 Madsangavi
 Sansari
 Dondegaon
 Gangamhalungi
 Mahadevpur
 Sarul
 Nandur Bahula
 Ganga Padhli
 Mahiravani
 Savargaon
 Aswali Bahula
 Gangavare
 Manoli
 Shastri Nagar
 Shingave Bahula
 Gaulane
 Matori
 Shevgedarna
 Samangaon
 Girnare
 Mohgaon
 Shilapur
 Eklahre
 Ambad Bu.

Villages under NMRDA in Niphad Taluka 
 Savali
 Godegaon
 Maouje Sukene
 Kokangaon
 Darna Sangavi
 Pimpalas
 Oune
 Shirasgaon
 Lalpadi
 Palkhed
 Narayangaon
 Behad
 Shimpi Takli
 Davachvadi
 Amrut Nagar
 Ambarkhed
 Chatori
 Raulas
 Ojhar
 Pimpalgaon (Baswant)
 Varhedarna
 Pimpri
 Vijaynagar
 Talvade
 Chehdi Khu.
 Ahergaon
 Banganga Nagar
 Pimpalgaon (Ni.)
 Nagapur
 Lonvadi
 Datyane
 Mahajanpur
 Chitegaon
 Karsul
 Thergaon
 Bhendali
 Chandori
 Narayan Tembhe
 Jivhale
 Ramnagar
 Saykheda
 Vadala Najik
 Dikshi
 Songaon
 Shingave
 Kasabe Sukene
 Sakore

Villages under NMRDA in Sinnar Taluka 
 Pandhurli
 Paaste
 Jongaltembhi
 Kundavadi
 Sawatamali Nagar
 Chincholi
 Naygaon
 Saradvadi
 Ghorvad
 Mohdari
 Jaygaon
 Maparvadi
 Khaprale
 Malgaon
 Belu
 Varagaon Pimpri
 Chandrapur
 Moh
 Agaskhind
 Patpimpri
 Vinchur Gavali
 Brahmanvadi
 Harsule
 Deshvandi
 Jambgaon
 Vadjhire
 Shashtri Nagar
 Sinnar Gramin
 Vadgaon Pingla
 Songiri
 Bhatvadi
 Chandrapur
 Mirpur

Villages under NMRDA in Dindori Taluka 
 Dindori
 Madkijamb
 Indore
 Ramshej
 Manori
 Pimpalnare
 Talegaon Dindori
 Vanarvadi
 Khatvad
 Dhakambe
 Varvandi
 Shivnai
 Ambedindori
 Ganeshgaon
 Akrale
 Korhate
 Khadaksukene
 Chinchkhed
 Kurnoli
 Janori
 Jaulake Dindori
 Gavalvadi
 Mohadi
 Vilvandi
 Kochargaon
 Bhoryacha Pada
 Tiloli
 Ravalgaon
 Deherevadi
 Ghagur
 June Dhagur
 Rasegaon

Villages under NMRDA in Igatpuri Taluka 
 Ghoti Budruk
 Avchitvadi
 Devle
 Daudat
 Khambale
 Vaki
 Manik khamb
 Mundhegaon
 Kavnai
 Mukne
 Padli Deshmukh
 Shenvad Khurd
 Garudeshwar
 Laxminagar
 Janori
 Krushn Nagar
 Nandurvaidya
 Kurhegaon
 Belgavhan Kurhe
 Gonde Dumala
 Vadivarhe
 Lahamgevadi
 Shenit
 Sakur
 Nandgaon Bu.
 Ghoti Khu.
 Pimpalgaon Dukra
 Kavad dara
 Dhamangaon
 Gambhirvadi
 Belgaon Varhale
 Malunje
 Samnere
 Mogre
 Somaj
 Umbarkon
 Ubhade
 Vaghere
 Dhamni
 Pimpalgaon Mor
 Khairgaon
 Kushegaon
 Shirsale
 Modale
 Gadgadsangavi
 Murambi
 Sanjegaon

Villages under NMRDA in Trambakeshwar Taluka 
 Kharoli
 Samundi
 Jharvad Khu.
 Dhadoshi
 Kajoli
 Bhilmal
 Pahine
 Mulegaon
 Vadholi
 Metghera Killa
 Talegaon (Trambak)
 Kochurli
 Ambai
 Sapgaon
 Shirasgaon
 Pimpalad (Trambak)
 Pengalvadi
 Talwade (Trambak)
 Anjneri
 Khambale
 Sakore
 Benjhe
 Brahmanvade (Trambak)
 Ghumodi
 Amboli
 Ganeshgaon Vaghera
 Divyacha Pada
 Pimpri Trambak
 Hirdi
 Rohile
 Malegaon
 Vinayak Nagar
 Gorthan
 Saapte
 Trimabak (Gramin)

See also

 Nashik Metropolitan Region Development Authority

References 

Cities and towns in Nashik district
Metropolitan areas of India